The Road to Reunion, 1865–1900 is a book by Paul Herman Buck. It won the 1938 Pulitzer Prize for History.

References 

Pulitzer Prize for History-winning works